The 1961 Chatham Cup was the 34th annual nationwide knockout football competition in New Zealand.

The competition was run on a regional basis, with regional associations each holding separate qualifying rounds.

Other teams known to have taken part in the final rounds included Otangarei United (Whangarei), Hamilton Technical Old Boys, Kahukura (Rotorua), Eastern Union (Gisborne), Moturoa (New Plymouth), Napier Rovers, Wanganui United, Kiwi United (Manawatu), Nelson Thistle and Timaru Thistle.

The 1961 final
Northern won the cup for a second time, having previously been champions in 1959; North Shore United made their third consecutive finals appearance, having won the cup in 1960. The match was thus both a match between the two previous winners and also a rematch of the 1959 final, with the same team winning on both occasions. Seven Northern players and six North Shore players played in both finals, these six latter players - among them England and New Zealand international Ken Armstrong - also having played in the winning side of 1960. The final was a free flowing affair, but no goals came until the half hour mark, when Northern took the lead through George Little. The score remained 1-0 until two minutes from the end of the match, when Bruce Campbell doubled Northern's lead.

Results

Second round

Third round

Fourth round

Fifth round

Quarter-finals

Semi-finals ("Island finals")

Final

References

Rec.Sport.Soccer Statistics Foundation New Zealand 1961 page

Chatham Cup
Chatham Cup
Chatham Cup
August 1961 sports events in New Zealand